The Towers of Bois-Maury (original French title: Les Tours de Bois-Maury) is a series of graphic novels that begun in 1984 by Belgian comic book creator Hermann.

Plot
Set in 11th century Europe, the series concerns the efforts of the wandering noble Sir Aymar de Bois-Maury, knight, to reclaim his ancestral home, Bois-Maury. Less focused on action than the other series of Hermann (like Jeremiah), Les Tours de Bois-Maury deals more with human thoughts and considerations.

Albums

Original publications in French
To date the series comprises the following albums:

Les Tours de Bois-Maury (originally published by Glenat )
 1. Babette
 2. Eloise de Montgri
 3. Germain
 4. Reinhardt
 5. Alda
 6. Sigurd
 7. William
 8. Le seldjouki
 9. Khaled
10. Olivier
16. L'Homme à la hache
Bois-Maury (originally published by Glenat )
11. Assunta
12. Rodrigo
13. Dulle Griet
14. Vassya
15. Œil de ciel 

All albums have been written and drawn by Hermann, except Rodrigo, Dulle Griet, Vassya and Œil de ciel , all written by his son Yves H..

English translations
The first few albums and Rodrigo were published by different companies, all of them under the series title, The Towers of Bois-Maury.
1. Babette
Titan Books, UK, 1985  Paperback. Reprinted with different cover in 1989
Dark Horse Comics (Strip Art Features), USA, 2002  Hardcover
2. Eloise de Montgri
Titan Books, UK, 1989  Paperback.
Dark Horse Comics (Strip Art Features), USA, 2002  Hardcover.
3. Germain
Catalan Communications, USA, 1990 
SAF Comics announced its publication for October 2003, but never had published it.
4. Alda
Heavy Metal magazine's July, 1990 (Vol. 14 No. 3) issue features the graphic novel
12. Rodrigo
Dark Horse Comics (Strip Art Features), USA, 2001  Hardcover.

Belgian comics titles